The Carinthian–Slovenian Alps are a mountain range in the eastern part of the Alps. They are located in Slovenia, Austria and, for a very small area in westernmost part of the range, in Italy.

Geography 
The range belongs to the drainage basin of the Danube River.

SOIUSA classification 
According to SOIUSA (International Standardized Mountain Subdivision of the Alps) the Carinthian–Slovenian Alps are an Alpine section, classified in the following way:
 main part = Eastern Alps
 major sector = Southern Limestone Alps
 section = Carinthian–Slovenian Alps
 code = II/C-35

Subdivision 
The Carinthian–Slovenian Alps are divided in two subsections:
 Karawanks (SL: Karavanke; DE: Karawanken) - SOIUSA code:II/C-35.I;
 Kamnik–Savinja Alps (SL: Kamniško-Savinjske Alpe; DE: Steiner Alpen) - SOIUSA code:II/C-35.II.

Notable summits

Some notable summits of the Carinthian–Slovenian Alps are:

References

Mountain ranges of Austria
Mountain ranges of Slovenia
Mountain ranges of Italy
Mountain ranges of the Alps